Melinda Wang (born December 18, 1990) is a Taiwanese-American figure skater who competed internationally for Taiwan in ladies' singles. She is a two-time (2008, 2011) Taiwanese national champion. She competed in the free skate at the 2008 World Championships and five Four Continents Championships.

Personal life 
Wang was born on December 18, 1990, in New York City, New York. She is currently a student and trains in Newark, Delaware. She enjoys dancing, baking, reading, and photography as her hobbies.

Skating career 
Wang started skating at the age of four. She competed in ice dancing in the United States, in partnership with Nathan Lim and Paul Wood.

In 2008 Wang began representing Taiwan in ladies' singles. She made her international debut at the 2008 Four Continents, where she finished 15th. Later that season, she competed at the 2008 World Championships in Gothenburg, Sweden; she qualified to the free skate and went on to finish 23rd.

Wang qualified to the free skate at four additional Four Continents Championships – in 2010, 2011, 2012, and 2013.

Programs

Competitive highlights

References

External links 

 

1990 births
Living people
Sportspeople from New York (state)
Taiwanese female single skaters
American sportswomen
American sportswomen of Chinese descent